The 500s decade ran from January 1, 500, to December 31, 509.

Significant people

References

Bibliography